General elections were held in Peru on 11 October 1936. In the presidential election, Luis A. Eguiguren of the  appeared to be heading for victory, but outgoing president Óscar R. Benavides ordered the count to be stopped and the election results were subsequently annulled.

Background
Incumbent president Benavides' term of office was due to expire in December 1936. He announced that he would not run for re-election and called elections for 11 October. There were eighteen political parties in existence, but most ran as alliances in the election. Four candidates were approved to run for office, with the election commission barring Víctor Raúl Haya de la Torre of the American Popular Revolutionary Alliance (APRA) under article 53 of the constitution, which banned 'international parties'.

Results

President
When it appeared Eguiguren was winning, Benavides ordered the count to be suspended on the basis that members of the banned APRA had voted for him. At the point it was stopped on 21 October, with 70 of the 119 provinces having completed the count, Eguiguren had 74,485 votes, or 37% of the total.

Aftermath
Under pressure from Benavides, on 4 November the outgoing Congress met and declared the election annulled. A motion by the Revolutionary Union that accused Benavides of having "presented the presidential and parliamentary elections of the period 1936–1941" was defeated by 64 votes to 13. Benavides subsequently forced Congress to pass a law extending his term until 1939 and then dissolved the legislature, instead ruling by decree and forming a new all-military government.

References

General
Peru
Presidential elections in Peru
Election and referendum articles with incomplete results
Annulled elections